Amiriyeh (also Romanized as Āmīrīyeh; also known as Amīrkhān, Qal‘eh-ye Amīrkhan, and Qal‘eh-ye Amīr Khān) is a village in Qushkhaneh-ye Bala Rural District, Qushkhaneh District, Shirvan County, North Khorasan Province, Iran. At the 2006 census, its population was 46, in 11 families.

References 

Populated places in Shirvan County